G protein-activated inward rectifier potassium channel 3 is a protein that in humans is encoded by the KCNJ9 gene.

Function 

Potassium channels are present in most mammalian cells, where they participate in a wide range of physiologic responses. The protein encoded by this gene is an integral membrane protein and inward-rectifier type potassium channel. The encoded protein, which has a greater tendency to allow potassium to flow into a cell rather than out of a cell, is controlled by G-proteins. It associates with another G-protein-activated potassium channel to form a heteromultimeric pore-forming complex.

Interactions 

KCNJ9 has been shown to interact with KCNJ6.

See also 
 G protein-coupled inwardly-rectifying potassium channel
 Inward-rectifier potassium ion channel

References

Further reading

External links 
 

Ion channels